Hatch is a town in Garfield County, Utah, United States. The population was 133 at the 2010 census.

History
Hatch was originally called "Mammoth", and under the latter name was settled in 1872. A post office called Hatch has been in operation since 1904.  The present name is after Meltier Hatch, a pioneer citizen.

Geography
Hatch is located in southwestern Garfield County, in the valley of the Sevier River near its headwaters. U.S. Route 89 passes through the town, leading north  to Panguitch, the county seat, and south  to Glendale.

Demographics

As of the census of 2000, there were 127 people, 41 households, and 33 families residing in the town. The population density was 471.7 people per square mile (181.6/km2). There were 81 housing units at an average density of 300.8 per square mile (115.8/km2). The racial makeup of the town was 93.70% White, 3.94% Asian, and 2.36% from two or more races. Hispanic or Latino of any race were 1.57% of the population.

There were 41 households, out of which 39.0% had children under 18 living with them, 63.4% were married couples living together, 9.8% had a female householder with no husband present, and 19.5% were non-families. 17.1% of all households were made up of individuals, and 7.3% had someone living alone who was 65 years of age or older. The average household size was 3.10, and the average family size was 3.48.

In the town, the population was spread out, with 33.1% under 18, 11.0% from 18 to 24, 22.0% from 25 to 44, 20.5% from 45 to 64, and 13.4% who were 65 years of age or older. The median age was 28 years. For every 100 females, there were 76.4 males. For every 100 females aged 18 and over, there were 77.1 males.

The median income for a household in the town was $37,083, and the median income for a family was $45,000. Males had a median income of $27,083 versus $25,938 for females. The per capita income for the town was $12,776. There were 5.9% of families and 2.9% of the population living below the poverty line, including no under eighteens and 28.6% of those over 64.

In the summer of 2010, the town began constructing a new town office/community center facility adjacent to the town park that will be completed in the fall of 2010.

Climate
The climate in this area has mild differences between highs and lows, and there is adequate rainfall year-round.   The Köppen Climate Classification subtype for this climate is "Cfb" (Marine West Coast Climate/Oceanic climate).

References

Towns in Garfield County, Utah
Towns in Utah
Populated places established in 1934
1934 establishments in Utah